Hayyim ben Isaac Raphael Alfandari (1660–1733) was rabbi in Constantinople during the latter half of the 17th and in the beginning of the 18th century. In his old age he went to Palestine, where he died. He was the author of Esh Dat (A Fiery Law), a collection of homilies printed together with his uncle's Muẓẓal me-Esh in Constantinople, 1718. Several short treatises by him are published in the works of others. Azulai speaks very highly of him as a scholar and as a preacher.

He is a member of the notable Alfandari family.

Jewish Encyclopedia bibliography
 Michael, Or ha-Ḥayyim, No. 854;
 Steinschneider, Cat. Bodl. col. 821.

References
 

Rabbis from Istanbul
Sephardi rabbis in Ottoman Palestine
17th-century rabbis from the Ottoman Empire
18th-century rabbis from the Ottoman Empire
1660 births
1733 deaths